Gordonia sinesedis is a bacterium from the genus of Gordonia that has been isolated from soil.

References

Further reading 
 

Mycobacteriales
Bacteria described in 2003